The Mishnah or the Mishna ("study by repetition", from the verb shanah , or "to study and review", also "secondary") is the first major written collection of the Jewish oral traditions that are known as the Oral Torah. It is also the first major work of rabbinic literature. The Mishnah was redacted by Judah ha-Nasi probably in Beit Shearim or Sepphoris at the beginning of the 3rd century CE in a time when, according to the Talmud, the persecution of the Jews and the passage of time raised the possibility that the details of the oral traditions of the Pharisees from the Second Temple period (516 BCE – 70 CE) would be forgotten. Most of the Mishnah is written in Mishnaic Hebrew, but some parts are in Aramaic.

The Mishnah consists of six orders (singular  ), each containing 7–12 tractates (singular  ; lit. "web"), 63 in total, and further subdivided into chapters and paragraphs. The word Mishnah can also indicate a single paragraph of the work, i.e. the smallest unit of structure in the Mishnah. For this reason the whole work is sometimes referred to in the plural form, .

Six orders

As a written compilation, the order of the Mishnah is by subject matter and includes a much broader selection of halakhic subjects and discusses individual subjects more thoroughly than the Midrash.

The Mishnah consists of six orders (singular  ), each containing 7–12 tractates (singular  ; lit. "web"), 63 in total. Each  is divided into chapters (singular ) and then paragraphs (singular ). In this last context, the word mishnah means a single paragraph of the work, i.e. the smallest unit of structure, leading to the use of the plural, "Mishnayot", for the whole work.

Because of the division into six orders, the Mishnah is sometimes called Shas (an acronym for Shisha Sedarim – the "six orders"), although that term is more often used for the Talmud as a whole.

The six orders are:
 Zeraim ("Seeds"), dealing with prayer and blessings, tithes and agricultural laws (11 tractates)
 Moed ("Festival"), pertaining to the laws of the Sabbath and the Festivals (12 tractates)
 Nashim ("Women"), concerning marriage and divorce, some forms of oaths and the laws of the nazirite (7 tractates)
 Nezikin ("Damages"), dealing with civil and criminal law, the functioning of the courts and oaths (10 tractates)
 Kodashim ("Holy things"), regarding sacrificial rites, the Temple, and the dietary laws (11 tractates) and
 Tohorot ("Purities"), pertaining to the laws of purity and impurity, including the impurity of the dead, the laws of food purity and bodily purity (12 tractates).

In each order (with the exception of Zeraim), tractates are arranged from biggest (in number of chapters) to smallest. A popular mnemonic consists of the acronym "Z'MaN NaKaT".

The Babylonian Talmud (Hagiga 14a) states that there were either six hundred or seven hundred orders of the Mishnah. Hillel the Elder organized them into six orders to make it easier to remember. The historical accuracy of this tradition is disputed. There is also a tradition that Ezra the scribe dictated from memory not only the 24 books of the Tanakh but 60 esoteric books. It is not known whether this is a reference to the Mishnah, but there is a case for saying that the Mishnah does consist of 60 tractates. (The current total is 63, but Makkot was originally part of Sanhedrin, and Bava Kamma, Bava Metzia and Bava Batra may be regarded as subdivisions of a single tractate Nezikin.)

Reuvein Margolies (1889–1971) posited that there were originally seven orders of Mishnah, citing a Gaonic tradition on the existence of a seventh order containing the laws of Sta"m (scribal practice) and Berachot (blessings).

Omissions
A number of important laws are not elaborated upon in the Mishnah. These include the laws of tzitzit, tefillin (phylacteries), mezuzot, the holiday of Hanukkah, and the laws of conversion to Judaism. These were later discussed in the minor tractates.

Nissim ben Jacob's Hakdamah Le'mafteach Hatalmud argued that it was unnecessary for Judah the Prince to discuss them as many of these laws were so well known. Margolies suggests that as the Mishnah was redacted after the Bar Kokhba revolt, Judah could not have included discussion of Hanukkah, which commemorates the Jewish revolt against the Seleucid Empire (the Romans would not have tolerated this overt nationalism). Similarly, there were then several decrees in place aimed at suppressing outward signs of national identity, including decrees against wearing tefillin and tzitzit; as conversion to Judaism was against Roman law, Judah would not have discussed this.

David Zvi Hoffmann suggests that there existed ancient texts analogous to the present-day Shulchan Aruch that discussed the basic laws of day to day living and it was therefore not necessary to focus on these laws in the Mishnah.

Mishnah, Gemara, and Talmud
Rabbinic commentary, debate and analysis on the Mishnah from the next four centuries, done in the Land of Israel and in Babylonia, were eventually redacted and compiled as well. In themselves they are known as Gemara. The books which set out the Mishnah in its original structure, together with the associated Gemara, are known as Talmuds. Two Talmuds were compiled, the Babylonian Talmud (to which the term "Talmud" normally refers) and the Jerusalem Talmud. Unlike the Hebrew Mishnah, the Gemara is written primarily in Aramaic.

Content and purpose

The Mishnah teaches the oral traditions by example, presenting actual cases being brought to judgment, usually along with (i) the debate on the matter, and (ii) the judgment that was given by a notable rabbi based on halakha, mitzvot, and spirit of the teaching ("Torah") that guided his decision.

In this way, the Mishnah brings to everyday reality the practice of the mitzvot as presented in the Torah, and aims to cover all aspects of human living, serve as an example for future judgments, and, most important, demonstrate pragmatic exercise of the Biblical laws, which was much needed since the time when the Second Temple was destroyed (70 CE). The Mishnah is thus not the development of new laws, but rather the collection of existing traditions.

The term "Mishnah" is related to the verb "shanah", to teach or repeat, and to the adjectives "sheni" and "mishneh", meaning "second". It is thus named for being both the one written authority (codex) secondary (only) to the Tanakh as a basis for the passing of judgment, a source and a tool for creating laws, and the first of many books to complement the Tanakh in certain aspects.

Oral law

Before the publication of the Mishnah, Jewish scholarship and judgement were predominantly oral, as according to the Talmud, it was not permitted to write them down. The earliest recorded oral law may have been of the midrashic form, in which halakhic discussion is structured as exegetical commentary on the Torah. Rabbis expounded on and debated the Tanakh without the benefit of written works (other than the Biblical books themselves), though some may have made private notes for example of court decisions. The oral traditions were far from monolithic, and varied among various schools, the most famous of which were the House of Shammai and the House of Hillel.

After the First Jewish–Roman War in 70 CE, with the end of the Second Temple Jewish center in Jerusalem, Jewish social and legal norms were in upheaval. The Rabbis were faced with the new reality of Judaism without a Temple (to serve as the center of teaching and study) and Judea without autonomy. It is during this period that Rabbinic discourse began to be recorded in writing. The possibility was felt that the details of the oral traditions of the Pharisees from the Second Temple period (530s BCE / 3230s AM – 70 CE/ 3830 AM) would be forgotten, so the justification was found to have these oral laws transcribed.

Over time, different traditions of the Oral Law came into being, raising problems of interpretation. According to the Mevo Hatalmud, many rulings were given in a specific context but would be taken out of it, or a ruling was revisited, but the second ruling would not become popularly known. To correct this, Judah the Prince took up the redaction of the Mishnah. If a point was of no conflict, he kept its language; where there was conflict, he reordered the opinions and ruled, and he clarified where context was not given. The idea was not to use his discretion, but rather to examine the tradition as far back as he could, and only supplement as required.

The Mishnah and the Hebrew Bible
According to Rabbinic Judaism, the Oral Torah was given to Moses with the Torah at Mount Sinai or Mount Horeb as an exposition to the latter. The accumulated traditions of the Oral Law, expounded by scholars in each generation from Moses onward, is considered as the necessary basis for the interpretation, and often for the reading, of the Written Law. Jews sometimes refer to this as the Masorah, roughly translated as tradition, though that word is often used in a narrower sense to mean traditions concerning the editing and reading of the Biblical text (see Masoretic Text). The resulting Jewish law and custom is called halakha.

While most discussions in the Mishnah concern the correct way to carry out laws recorded in the Torah, it usually presents its conclusions without explicitly linking them to any scriptural passage, though scriptural quotations do occur. For this reason it is arranged in order of topics rather than in the form of a Biblical commentary. (In a very few cases, there is no scriptural source at all and the law is described as Halakha leMoshe miSinai, "law to Moses from Sinai".) The Midrash halakha, by contrast, while presenting similar laws, does so in the form of a Biblical commentary and explicitly links its conclusions to details in the Biblical text. These Midrashim often predate the Mishnah.

The Mishnah also quotes the Torah for principles not associated with law, but just as practical advice, even at times for humor or as guidance for understanding historical debates.

Rejection
Some Jews do not accept the codification of the oral law at all. Karaite Judaism, for example, recognises only the Tanakh as authoritative in Halakha (Jewish religious law) and theology. It rejects the codification of the Oral Torah in the Mishnah and Talmud and subsequent works of mainstream Rabbinic Judaism which maintain that the Talmud is an authoritative interpretation of the Torah. Karaites maintain that all of the divine commandments handed down to Moses by God were recorded in the written Torah without additional Oral Law or explanation. As a result, Karaite Jews do not accept as binding the written collections of the oral tradition in the Midrash or Talmud. The Karaites comprised a significant portion of the world Jewish population in the 10th and 11th centuries CE, and remain extant, although they currently number in the thousands.

Authorship

The rabbis who contributed to the Mishnah are known as the Tannaim, of whom approximately 120 are known. The period during which the Mishnah was assembled spanned about 130 years, or five generations, in the first and second centuries CE. Judah ha-Nasi is credited with the final redaction and publication of the Mishnah, although there have been a few additions since his time: those passages that cite him or his grandson, Judah II, and the end of tractate Sotah, which refers to the period after Judah's death. In addition to redacting the Mishnah, Judah and his court also ruled on which opinions should be followed, although the rulings do not always appear in the text.

Most of the Mishnah is related without attribution. This usually indicates that many sages taught so, or that Judah the Prince ruled so. The halakhic ruling usually follows that view. Sometimes, however, it appears to be the opinion of a single sage, and the view of the sages collectively (hachamim) is given separately.

As Judah the Prince went through the tractates, the Mishnah was set forth, but throughout his life some parts were updated as new information came to light. Because of the proliferation of earlier versions, it was deemed too hard to retract anything already released, and therefore a second version of certain laws were released. David Zvi Hoffmann suggests that Mishnah Rishonah actually refers to texts from earlier Sages upon which Rebbi based his Mishnah.

The Talmud records a tradition that unattributed statements of the law represent the views of Rabbi Meir (Sanhedrin 86a), which supports the theory (recorded by Sherira Gaon in his famous Iggeret) that he was the author of an earlier collection. For this reason, the few passages that actually say "this is the view of Rabbi Meir" represent cases where the author intended to present Rabbi Meir's view as a "minority opinion" not representing the accepted law.

There are also references to the "Mishnah of Rabbi Akiva", suggesting a still earlier collection; on the other hand, these references may simply mean his teachings in general. Another possibility is that Rabbi Akiva and Rabbi Meir established the divisions and order of subjects in the Mishnah, making them the authors of a school curriculum rather than of a book.

Authorities are divided on whether Rabbi Judah the Prince recorded the Mishnah in writing or established it as an oral text for memorisation. The most important early account of its composition, the Iggeret Rav Sherira Gaon (Epistle of Rabbi Sherira Gaon) is ambiguous on the point, although the Spanish recension leans to the theory that the Mishnah was written. However, the Talmud records that, in every study session, there was a person called the tanna appointed to recite the Mishnah passage under discussion. This may indicate that, even if the Mishnah was reduced to writing, it was not available on general distribution.

Mishnah studies

Textual variants
Very roughly, there are two traditions of Mishnah text. One is found in manuscripts and printed editions of the Mishnah on its own, or as part of the Jerusalem Talmud. The other is found in manuscripts and editions of the Babylonian Talmud; though there is sometimes a difference between the text of a whole paragraph printed at the beginning of a discussion (which may be edited to conform with the text of the Mishnah-only editions) and the line-by-line citations in the course of the discussion.

Robert Brody, in his Mishna and Tosefta Studies (Jerusalem 2014), warns against over-simplifying the picture by assuming that the Mishnah-only tradition is always the more authentic, or that it represents a "Palestinian" as against a "Babylonian" tradition. Manuscripts from the Cairo Geniza, or citations in other works, may support either type of reading or other readings altogether.

Manuscripts
Complete mss. bolded.

The Literature of the Jewish People in the Period of the Second Temple and the Talmud, Volume 3 The Literature of the Sages: First Part: Oral Tora, Halakha, Mishna, Tosefta, Talmud, External Tractates. Compendia Rerum Iudaicarum ad Novum Testamentum, Ed. Shmuel Safrai, Brill, 1987,

Printed editions
The first printed edition of the Mishnah was published in Naples. There have been many subsequent editions, including the late 19th century Vilna edition, which is the basis of the editions now used by the religious public.

Vocalized editions were published in Italy, culminating in the edition of David ben Solomon Altaras, publ. Venice 1737. The Altaras edition was republished in Mantua in 1777, in Pisa in 1797 and 1810 and in Livorno in many editions from 1823 until 1936: reprints of the vocalized Livorno editions were published in Israel in 1913, 1962, 1968 and 1976. These editions show some textual variants by bracketing doubtful words and passages, though they do not attempt detailed textual criticism. The Livorno editions are the basis of the Sephardic tradition for recitation.

As well as being printed on its own, the Mishnah is included in all editions of the Babylonian and Jerusalem Talmuds. Each paragraph is printed on its own, and followed by the relevant Gemara discussion. However, that discussion itself often cites the Mishnah line by line. While the text printed in paragraph form has generally been standardized to follow the Vilna edition, the text cited line by line in the Gemara often preserves important variants, which sometimes reflect the readings of older manuscripts.

The nearest approach to a critical edition is that of Hanoch Albeck. There is also an edition by Yosef Qafiḥ of the Mishnah together with the commentary of Maimonides, which compares the base text used by Maimonides with the Napoli and Vilna editions and other sources.

Oral traditions and pronunciation

The Mishnah was and still is traditionally studied through recitation (out loud). Jewish communities around the world preserved local melodies for chanting the Mishnah, and distinctive ways of pronouncing its words.

Many medieval manuscripts of the Mishnah are vowelized, and some of these, especially some fragments found in the Genizah, are partially annotated with Tiberian cantillation marks.

Today, many communities have a special tune for the Mishnaic passage "Bammeh madliqin" in the Friday night service; there may also be tunes for Mishnaic passages in other parts of the liturgy, such as the passages in the daily prayers relating to sacrifices and incense and the paragraphs recited at the end of the Musaf service on Shabbat. Otherwise, there is often a customary intonation used in the study of Mishnah or Talmud, somewhat similar to an Arabic mawwal, but this is not reduced to a precise system like that for the Biblical books. (In some traditions this intonation is the same as or similar to that used for the Passover Haggadah.) Recordings have been made for Israeli national archives, and Frank Alvarez-Pereyre has published a book-length study of the Syrian tradition of Mishnah reading on the basis of these recordings.

Most vowelized editions of the Mishnah today reflect standard Ashkenazic vowelization, and often contain mistakes. The Albeck edition of the Mishnah was vocalized by Hanoch Yelon, who made careful eclectic use of both medieval manuscripts and current oral traditions of pronunciation from Jewish communities all over the world. The Albeck edition includes an introduction by Yelon detailing his eclectic method.

Two institutes at the Hebrew University in Jerusalem have collected major oral archives which hold extensive recordings of Jews chanting the Mishnah using a variety of melodies and many different kinds of pronunciation. These institutes are the Jewish Oral Traditions Research Center and the National Voice Archives (the Phonoteca at the Jewish National and University Library). See below for external links.

Commentaries

The main work discussing the Mishnah is the Talmud, as outlined, the Babylonian and Jerusalem versions.
However, the Talmud is not usually viewed as a commentary on the Mishnah, per se - because, i.a., 

it also has many other goals, and its analysis here - "Gemara" - often entails long, tangential discussions 
(also, neither version covers the whole Mishnah, with each on about 50–70% of the text. ).
Here, then, numerous commentaries-proper on the Mishna have been produced, typically intended  to allow for the study of the work without requiring direct reference to (and facility for) the Gemara. 
Chronologically:
Rishonim:
 In 1168, Maimonides (Rambam) published Kitab as-Siraj (The Book of the Lantern) a comprehensive commentary on the Mishnah. It was written in Arabic using Hebrew letters (what is termed Judeo-Arabic) and was one of the first commentaries of its kind. In it, Rambam condensed the associated Talmudical debates, and offered his conclusions in a number of undecided issues. Of particular significance are the various introductory sections – as well as the introduction to the work itself – these are widely quoted in other works on the Mishnah, and on the Oral law in general. Perhaps the most famous is his introduction to the tenth chapter of tractate Sanhedrin where he enumerates the thirteen fundamental beliefs of Judaism.
 Rabbi Samson of Sens (France) was, apart from Maimonides, one of the few rabbis of the early medieval era to compose a Mishnah commentary on some tractates. It is printed in many editions of the Mishnah. It is interwoven with his commentary on major parts of the Tosefta.
 Asher ben Jehiel (Rosh)'s commentary on some tractates
 Menachem Meiri's commentary on most of the Mishnah, Beit HaBechirah, providing a digest of the Talmudic-discussion and Rishonim there
 An 11th-century CE commentary of the Mishnah, composed by Rabbi Nathan ben Abraham, President of the Academy in Eretz Israel. This relatively unheard-of commentary was first printed in Israel in 1955.
 A 12th-century Italian commentary of the Mishnah, made by Rabbi Isaac ben Melchizedek (only Seder Zera'im is known to have survived)
Acharonim:
 Rabbi Obadiah ben Abraham of Bertinoro (15th century) wrote one of the most popular Mishnah commentaries. He draws on Maimonides' work but also offers Talmudical material (in effect a summary of the Talmudic discussion) largely following the commentary of Rashi. In addition to its role as a commentary on the Mishnah, this work is often used by students of Talmud as a review-text and is often referred to as "the Bartenura" or "the Ra'V".
 Yomtov Lipman Heller wrote a commentary called Tosafot Yom Tov. In the introduction Heller says that his aim is to make additions (tosafoth) to Bertinoro’s commentary. The glosses are sometimes quite detailed and analytic. That is why it is sometimes compared to the Tosafot – discussions of Babylonian gemara by French and German scholars of the 12th–13th centuries. In many compact Mishnah printings, a condensed version of his commentary, titled Ikar Tosafot Yom Tov, is featured.
 Other Acharonim who have written Mishnah commentaries:
 The Melechet Shlomo (Solomon Adeni; early 17th century)
 Kav veNaki (Amsterdam 1697) by R. Elisha Ben Avraham, a brief commentary on the entire Mishnah drawing from "the Bartenura", reprinted 20 times since its publication 
 Hon Ashir by Immanuel Hai Ricchi (Amsterdam 1731)
 The Vilna Gaon (Shenot Eliyahu on parts of the Mishnah, and glosses Eliyaho Rabba, Chidushei HaGra, Meoros HaGra)
19th century
 A (the) prominent commentary here is Tiferet Yisrael by Rabbi Israel Lipschitz. It is subdivided into two parts, one more general and the other more analytical, titled Yachin and Boaz respectively (after two large pillars in the Temple in Jerusalem). Although Rabbi Lipschutz has faced some controversy in certain Hasidic circles, he was greatly respected by such sages as Rabbi Akiva Eiger, whom he frequently cites, and is widely accepted in the Yeshiva world. The Tiferet Yaakov is an important gloss on the Tiferet Yisrael.
Others from this time include:
 Rabbi Akiva Eiger (glosses, rather than a commentary)
 The Mishnah Rishonah on Zeraim and the Mishnah Acharonah on Tehorot (Rav Efrayim Yitzchok from Premishla)
 The Sidrei Tehorot on Kelim and Ohalot (the commentary on the rest of Tehorot and on Eduyot is lost) by Gershon Henoch Leiner, the Radziner Rebbe
 The Gulot Iliyot (Rav Dov Ber Lifshitz) on Mikvaot
 The Ahavat Eitan by Rav Avrohom Abba Krenitz (the great grandfather of Rav Malkiel Kotler)
 The Chazon Ish on Zeraim and Tohorot
Commentaries produced in the 20th century:
 Hayim Nahman Bialik's commentary to Seder Zeraim with vocalization (partially available here) in 1930 was one of the first attempts to create a modern commentary on Mishnah. His decision to use the Vilna text, as opposed to a scientific edition, as well as write an introduction to every mesechta that included a description of the content and all of the relevant biblical material influenced Hanoch Albeck, whose project was considered a continuation and expansion of Bialik's. 
 Hanoch Albeck's edition (1952–59) (vocalized by Hanoch Yelon), includes the former's extensive commentary on each Mishnah, as well as introductions to each tractate (Masekhet) and order (Seder). This commentary tends to focus on the meaning of the mishnayot themselves, without as much reliance on the Gemara's interpretation and is, therefore, considered valuable as a tool for the study of Mishnah as an independent work. Especially important are the scholarly notes in the back of the commentary.
 Symcha Petrushka's commentary was written in Yiddish in 1945 (published in Montreal). Its vocalization is supposed to be of high quality.
 The commentary by Rabbi Pinhas Kehati, which uses the Albeck text of the Mishnah, is written in Modern Israeli Hebrew and based on classical and contemporary works, has become popular in the late 20th century. The commentary is designed to make the Mishnah accessible to a wide readership. Each tractate is introduced with an overview of its contents, including historical and legal background material, and each Mishnah is prefaced by a thematic introduction. The current version of this edition is printed with the Bartenura commentary as well as Kehati's.
 The encyclopedic editions put out by Mishnat Rav Aharon (Beis Medrosho Govoah, Lakewood) on Peah, Sheviit, Challah, and Yadayim.
 Rabbi Yehuda Leib Ginsburg wrote a commentary on ethical issues, Musar HaMishnah. The commentary appears for the entire text except for Tohorot and Kodashim.
 Shmuel Safrai, Chana Safrai and Ze'ev Safrai have half completed a 45 volume socio-historic commentary "Mishnat Eretz Yisrael".
 Mishnah Sdura, a format specially designed so as to facilitate recital and memorization, produced by Rabbi E. Dordek in 1992. The layout is such that an entire chapter and its structure is readily visible, with each Mishnah, in turn, displayed in its component parts using line breaks (click on above image to view); includes tables summarizing each tractate, and the Kav veNaki commentary.
ArtScroll's "Elucidated Mishnah", a phrase-by-phrase translation and elucidation based on the Bertinoro - following the format of the Schottenstein Edition Talmud. Its "Yad Avraham" commentary comprises supplementary explanations and notes, drawing on the Gemara and the other Mishnah commentaries and cross referencing the Shulchan Aruch as applicable. The work also includes a general introduction to each tractate. The Modern Hebrew (Ryzman) edition includes all these features.

As a historical source
Both the Mishnah and Talmud contain little serious biographical studies of the people discussed therein, and the same tractate will conflate the points of view of many different people. Yet, sketchy biographies of the Mishnaic sages can often be constructed with historical detail from Talmudic and Midrashic sources.

According to the Encyclopaedia Judaica (Second Edition), it is accepted that Judah the Prince added, deleted, and rewrote his source material during the process of redacting the Mishnah. Modern authors who have provided examples of these changes include J.N. Epstein and S. Friedman.

Following Judah the Prince's redaction there remained a number of different versions of the Mishnah in circulation. The Mishnah used in the Babylonian rabbinic community differing markedly from that used in the Palestinian one. Indeed within these rabbinic communities themselves there are indications of different versions being used for study. These differences are shown in divergent citations of individual Mishnah passages in the Talmud Yerushalmi and the Talmud Bavli, and in variances of medieval manuscripts and early editions of the Mishnah. The best known examples of these differences is found in J.N.Epstein’s Introduction to the Text of the Mishnah (1948).

Epstein has also concluded that the period of the Amoraim was one of further deliberate changes to the text of the Mishnah, which he views as attempts to return the text to what was regarded as its original form. These lessened over time, as the text of the Mishnah became more and more regarded as authoritative.

Many modern historical scholars have focused on the timing and the formation of the Mishnah. A vital question is whether it is composed of sources which date from its editor's lifetime, and to what extent is it composed of earlier, or later sources. Are Mishnaic disputes distinguishable along theological or communal lines, and in what ways do different sections derive from different schools of thought within early Judaism? Can these early sources be identified, and if so, how? In response to these questions, modern scholars have adopted a number of different approaches.
 Some scholars hold that there has been extensive editorial reshaping of the stories and statements within the Mishnah (and later, in the Talmud.) Lacking outside confirming texts, they hold that we cannot confirm the origin or date of most statements and laws, and that we can say little for certain about their authorship. In this view, the questions above are impossible to answer. See, for example, the works of Louis Jacobs, Baruch M. Bokser, Shaye J. D. Cohen, Steven D. Fraade.
 Some scholars hold that the Mishnah and Talmud have been extensively shaped by later editorial redaction, but that it contains sources which we can identify and describe with some level of reliability. In this view, sources can be identified to some extent because each era of history and each distinct geographical region has its own unique feature, which one can trace and analyze. Thus, the questions above may be analyzed. See, for example, the works of Goodblatt, Lee Levine, David C. Kraemer and Robert Goldenberg.
 Some scholars hold that many or most of the statements and events described in the Mishnah and Talmud usually occurred more or less as described, and that they can be used as serious sources of historical study. In this view, historians do their best to tease out later editorial additions (itself a very difficult task) and skeptically view accounts of miracles, leaving behind a reliable historical text. See, for example, the works of Saul Lieberman, David Weiss Halivni, Avraham Goldberg and Dov Zlotnick.

Cultural references
A notable literary work on the composition of the Mishnah is Milton Steinberg's novel As a Driven Leaf.

See also

 Baraita
 Jewish commentaries on the Bible
 List of tractates, chapters, mishnahs and pages in the Talmud
 Mishnah Yomisdaily cycle of Mishna studying
 Mishneh Torah
 Tosefta

Notes

References

English translations
 Philip Blackman. Mishnayoth. The Judaica Press, Ltd., reprinted 2000. Online PDF at HebrewBooks: Zeraim, Moed, Nashim, Nezikin, Kodashim, Tehorot.
 Herbert Danby. The Mishnah. Oxford, 1933.
 Jacob Neusner. The Mishnah: A New Translation. New Haven, reprint 1991.
 Isidore Epstein (ed.). Soncino Talmud. London, 1935-1952. Includes Mishnah-translations for those tractates without Gemara. 
 Various editors. The Mishnah, a new translation with commentary Yad Avraham. New York: Mesorah Publications, since the 1990s. (ArtScroll mentioned above)
 Yoseph Milstein + Various editors. The Mishnah, a new integrated translation and commentary based on Rabbeinu Ovadiah M'Bartenurah, Machon Yisrael Trust, available online at eMishnah.com.
Various editors. Sefaria full text of the Mishnah with various open-source English translations.

Historical study
 Shalom Carmy (Ed.) Modern Scholarship in the Study of Torah: Contributions and Limitations Jason Aronson, Inc.
 Shaye J.D. Cohen, "Patriarchs and Scholarchs", Proceedings of the American Academy for Jewish Research 48 (1981), pp. 57–87
 Steven D. Fraade, "The Early Rabbinic Sage," in The Sage in Israel and the Ancient Near East, ed. John G. Gammie and Leo G. Perdue (Winona Lake, Indiana: Eisenbrauns, 1990), pp. 417–23
 Robert Goldenberg The Sabbath-Law of Rabbi Meir (Missoula, Montana: Scholars Press, 1978)
 John W McGinley  'The Written' as the Vocation of Conceiving Jewishly 
 Jacob Neusner Making the Classics in Judaism (Atlanta: Scholars Press, 1989), pp. 1–13 and 19–44
 Jacob Neusner Judaism: The Evidence of the Mishnah (Chicago: University of Chicago Press, 1981), pp. 14–22.
 Gary Porton, The Traditions of Rabbi Ishmael (Leiden: E.J. Brill, 1982), vol. 4, pp. 212–25
 Dov Zlotnick, The Iron Pillar Mishnah (Jerusalem: Bialik Institute, 1988), pp. 8–9
 Reuvain Margolies, Yesod Ha-Mishnah V'Arichatah (Heb.)
 David Tzvi Hoffman, Mishnah Rishonah U'flugta D'tanna'e (Heb)
 Hanokh Yalon, Mavo le-nikud ha-Mishnah [Introduction to the vocalization of the Mishnah] (Jerusalem 1964) (Heb)
 Robert Brody, Mishna and Tosefta Studies (Jerusalem 2014)

Recitation
 Frank Alvarez-Pereyre, La Transmission Orale de la Mishna. Une methode d'analyse appliquee a la tradition d'Alep: Jerusalem 1990

External links

Wikimedia projects
 
 
 
 Wikisource's Open Mishna Project is developing Mishnah texts, commentaries, and translations. The project is currently available in four languages: Hebrew (the largest collection), English, French and Portuguese.

Digitised manuscripts
 Complete Mishnah manuscript (15th century CE), Cambridge Digital Library

Other electronic texts
 Learn Mishna in Someone's Memory – Create a Shloshim Mishnah list online.
 Mechon Mamre (Hebrew) – Hebrew text of the Mishnah according to Maimonides' version (based on the manuscript of his Mishnah commentary in his own handwriting).
 The Structured Mishnah – Hebrew text according to the Albeck edition (without vowels) with special formatting.
 Online Treasury of Talmudic Manuscripts, Jewish National and University Library in Hebrew.
 Codex Kaufmann of the Mishnah – High resolution images of this important textual witness.
 eMishnah – English Translation & Commentary.
 Mishnah (Hebrew & English) – English text as translated in The William Davidson edition of the Koren Noé Talmud, with commentary by Rabbi Adin Even-Israel Steinsaltz.

Mishnah study and the daily Mishnah
 
  – One Mishnah per day. (Note: this study-cycle follows a different schedule than the regular one; contains extensive archives in English).
 Mishnah Yomit – MishnahYomit.com hosts a weekly publication complementing the learning of people studying the regular program. It include articles, review questions and learning aids.
  – A program of two Mishnayot per day. Currently inactive, but archives contain the complete text of Kehati in English for Moed, Nashim, Nezikin, and about half of Kodashim.
  – Custom learning and review programs for Mishnah.
 MishnaSdura – Popular edition of Hebrew text (with vowels), used in many schools, formatted to encourage review and aid memory. Tables summarizing content. Mishna songs and recordings. Wiki article in Hebrew Mishna Sdura
 Perek HaYomi (Hebrew) – Host to Shiurim, and learning and review according to the Perek HaYomi in Mishna instituted by the Maharal.
 2 Mishnas A Day – A program of learning two mishnayos every day. Site include Hebrew and English together with a link for audio for each day.

Audio lectures
 Rav Avraham Kosman – Slabodka on the Mishnah and Talmud in English – Produced in Israel
 Mishna Audio – given by Rabbi Chaim Brown in English
 Rav Grossman on the Mishna in English produced in Los Angeles
 Download all 6 tractates of Mishnah for Free on TorahDownloads.com
 The "Master Torah" Mishnah Ba'al Peh Program by Rabbi Meir Pogrow

Oral traditions and pronunciation
 The National Sound Archives at the Hebrew University (catalogue not currently online).
 Tradition and Relevance – Recordings of Seder Zera'im in Syrian tradition

 
3rd-century texts
Hebrew words and phrases in Jewish law
Hebrew words and phrases
Hebrew-language literature
Jewish texts in Aramaic
Jewish texts